The year 1710 in science and technology involved some significant events.

Events
 The Royal Society of Sciences in Uppsala is founded in Uppsala, Sweden, as the Collegium curiosorum ("College of the Curious").

Astronomy
 Edmond Halley, comparing his observations with Ptolemy's catalog, discovers the proper motion of some "fixed" stars.

Physiology and medicine
 Alexis Littré, in his treatise Diverses observations anatomiques, is the first physician to suggest the possibility of performing a lumbar colostomy for an obstruction of the colon.
 Stephen Hales makes the first experimental measurement of the capacity of a mammalian heart.

Technology
 Jakob Christof Le Blon invents a three-color printing process with red, blue, and yellow ink. Years later he adds black introducing the earliest four-color printing process.

Zoology
 René Antoine Ferchault de Réaumur produces a paper on the use of spiders to produce silk.

Publications
 John Arbuthnot publishes "An argument for Divine Providence, taken from the constant regularity observed in the births of both sexes" in Philosophical Transactions of the Royal Society of London.

Births

 April 15 – William Cullen, Scottish physician and chemist (died 1790)
 April 25 – James Ferguson, Scottish astronomer (died 1776)
 May 18 – Johann II Bernoulli, Swiss mathematician (died 1790)
 June 10 – James Short, Scottish mathematician and optician (died 1768)
 July 21 – Paul Möhring, German physician and zoologist (died 1792)
 August 13 – William Heberden, English physician who gives the first description of angina pectoris (died 1801)
 August 20 – Thomas Simpson, English mathematician (died 1761)
 September 3 – Abraham Trembley, Genevan naturalist (died 1784)

Deaths
 February 25 – Daniel Greysolon, Sieur du Lhut, French explorer (born c. 1639)
 July 25 – Gottfried Kirch, German astronomer (born 1639)
 September 23 – Ole Rømer, Danish astronomer (born 1644)
 Jean de Fontaney, French Jesuit mathematician and astronomer (born 1643)

References

 
18th century in science
1710s in science